The women's 10000 m points race in road speed skating at the 2017 World Games took place on 25 July 2017 at the Millennium Park in Wrocław, Poland.

Competition format
A total of 30 athletes entered the competition. During the competition athletes can collect points on 16 sprints. The skater who came first receives two points. The skater who came second receives one point. At the final sprint the best three athletes receive their points, respectively: 3,2 and 1. The athlete with the most points is the winner. If at least two athletes have the same points score, the athlete with the lower finish time receives the higher place.

Results

References 

Road speed skating at the 2017 World Games
2017 World Games